Pradines may refer to:

Maurice Pradines, a French philosopher
places in France:
Pradines, Corrèze, a commune in the department of Corrèze
Pradines, Loire, a commune in the department of Loire
Pradines, Lot, a commune in the department of Lot